Charis Baniotis (born 27 March 1960) is a retired Greek football defender.
His nephew is Konstantinos Baniotis.

References

1960 births
Living people
Greek footballers
PAOK FC players
Panthrakikos F.C. players
Olympiacos F.C. players
Xanthi F.C. players
Super League Greece players
Association football defenders
Footballers from Komotini